Michael B. Adam, ONL (born June 3, 1981) is a Canadian curler who won gold at the 2006 Winter Olympics.

Biography

Born in Labrador City, Newfoundland and Labrador, Adam won a bronze medal at the Canada Winter Games in 1999.

Adam was part of Gushue's 2001 Canadian Junior Curling Championships winning team, when he played lead. Adam returned the following year at the 2002 Canadian Juniors, but played third for Ryan Ledrew, and finished 4–8. He was still on Gushue's team as well, and played second at the provincials that year. In 2003, they won provincials, but by this time Adam was just the team's alternate. In 2004 Adam moved to Keith Ryan's team where he played second. Failing to win at the provincials with Ryan, Adam joined Gushue who had won provincials as his alternate at the 2004 Nokia Brier. In 2005 Adam was left off the team, but rejoined in 2006 as the alternate once again for the Olympics. He was replaced for the 2006–07 season.

Adam was the alternate for the Canadian 2006 Winter Olympics curling team skipped by Brad Gushue. As the team's alternate, he only played one game when lead Jamie Korab was ill.

Adam currently resides in Harbour Grace.

Awards 
World Junior Curling Championship: Sportsmanship Award - 2001

References

External links
 
 

1981 births
Curlers at the 2006 Winter Olympics
Curlers from Newfoundland and Labrador
Living people
Medalists at the 2006 Winter Olympics
Members of the Order of Newfoundland and Labrador
Olympic curlers of Canada
Olympic gold medalists for Canada
Olympic medalists in curling
People from Labrador City

Canadian male curlers
21st-century Canadian people